Vinod Kumar (born 31 July 1987) is an Indian cricketer. He made his first-class debut for Kerala in the 2016–17 Ranji Trophy on 5 November 2016.

References

External links
 

1987 births
Living people
Indian cricketers
Kerala cricketers
Cricketers from Thrissur